The Porsche 996 is the internal designation for the 911 model manufactured by the German automaker Porsche from 1997 until 2006. It was replaced by the 997 in 2004, but the high performance Turbo S, GT2 and GT3 variants remained in production until 2006. The 996 had little in common with its predecessor, with the first all new chassis platform since the original 911 and a new water-cooled engine. Technically, it was a major change, a complete breakthrough from the original car other than the overall layout.

The 996's development was shared with the roadster-only Porsche Boxster (986) whose nameplate was making its debut as Porsche's entry-level offering. The 986 was released shortly before the 996 for sales. Commonalities between the 996 and 986 included the front suspension, various interior components, and the engine, all of which were enlarged for the 996. However, the multi-link rear suspension was derived from the preceding 993. This was done mainly to save development costs as Porsche was facing financial troubles at that time. This move resulted in cost savings of approximately 30% in the development of the car.

At its debut, the 996 featured the most significant change from the classic 911 series: a water-cooled engine replacing the previously air-cooled engine. Progressively stringent emissions and noise regulations, environmental concerns, a higher expectation for refinement and the need for a high-performance 4 valve per cylinder engine made the switch necessary. Other major changes include a completely new platform having a sleeker body with a more raked windshield, and a re-designed interior along with new "fried egg" shaped headlamps (so called due to the amber coloured turn signals) instead of previous "bug eye" headlamps.

Design and history

During the 1990s, Porsche was facing financial troubles and rumours of a proposed takeover were being spread. The signature air-cooled flat-6 of the 911 was reaching the limits of its potential as made evident by the 993. Stricter emissions regulations worldwide further forced Porsche to think of a replacement of the air-cooled unit. In order to improve manufacturing processes, Porsche took the aid of leading Japanese car manufacturer Toyota whose consultants would assist in the overhaul of the Zuffenhausen manufacturing facility introducing mass production techniques which would allow Porsche to carry out production processes more efficiently. Porsche had realised that in order to keep the 911 in production, it would need radical changes. This led to the development of the 996. The sharing of development between the new 911 and the entry level Boxster model allowed Porsche to save development costs. This move also resulted in interchangeable parts between the two models bringing down maintenance costs.

The Porsche 996 was a new design developed by Pinky Lai under Porsche design chief Harm Lagaay from 1992 to 1994; it was the first 911 that was completely redesigned, and carried over little from its predecessor as Porsche wanted the design team to design a 911 for the next millennium. Featuring an all new body, interior, and the first water-cooled engine, the 996 replaced the 993 from which only the front suspension, rear multi-link suspension, and a 6-speed manual transmission were retained in revised form. The 996 had a drag coefficient of  resulting from hours spent in the wind tunnel. The 996 is  longer and  wider than its predecessor. It is also 45% stiffer courtesy of a chassis formed from high-strength steel. Additionally, it is  lighter despite having additional radiators and coolant.

All models of the 996 generation of the Porsche 911 (excluding GT3 / GT3 RS / GT2 & Turbo models) sports car were afflicted with a vulnerability in the intermediate shaft (IMS) that drove their engines' camshafts. Year 2000 and later 996 models with the single row IMS bearing were reported to have a 8% failure rate under warranty. Failure of the sealed ball bearing within the IMS leads to varying degrees of engine failure. In general, after an IMS bearing failure, the engine internals could be contaminated with debris from the failure that requires the engine to be stripped and rebuilt. In severe failure modes, cam timing could be affected, leading to valve-piston impact, necessitating a rebuild or replacement of the entire engine or affected components including cylinder heads, pistons, and intermediate shaft. Thankfully this issue can be mitigated by replacing the intermediate shaft bearing as part of regular scheduled maintenance. Another well known issue with these 996 models is cylinder bore scoring which results in increased oil consumption and piston noise, ultimately requiring an engine rebuild or replacement to correct this issue.

The 996 had the same front end as the entry-level Boxster. After requests from the Carrera owners about their premium cars looking like a "lower priced car that looked just like theirs did", Porsche redesigned the headlamps of the Carrera in 2002 similar to the high performance Turbo's headlamps. The design for the initial "fried egg" shaped headlamps could be traced back to the 1997 911 GT1 race car.

In 2005, Porsche introduced the Turbo S, which had the X50 option included as standard equipment, with the formerly optional Carbon fibre-reinforced Silicon Carbide (C/SiC) composite ceramic brakes (PCCB) also included as standard.

In 2002, the standard Carrera models underwent the above-mentioned facelift. It also features a rear glass hatch which gave the driver access to the storage compartment. Also in 2002, the Carrera 4S model was first introduced. The C4S, as it is called among the enthusiasts, shares the wide-body look of the Turbo as well as the brakes and suspension.

Turbo

The 996 Turbo debuted at the Frankfurt Auto show in September 1999 and went on sale in the US in summer of 2000 as a 2001 model. The Turbo is powered by a water-cooled twin-turbocharged and intercooled 3.6-litre flat-6 engine derived from the 1998 Le Mans winning 911 GT1 race car. It features an all-wheel drive system and was available with either a 6-speed manual or a 5-speed Tiptronic transmission. It has revised styling and a wider stance than the naturally aspirated 996 Carrera models, along with new bi-xenon headlamps and a fixed rear wing. The bodywork was also revised to allow airflow to 3 radiators up front and to accommodate 18-inch wheels and tyres.

Other features introduced in 2002 were a glove box, center mounted cup-holders, an optional Bose stereo and rain-sensing wipers.

In 2003, Porsche North America restated their horsepower numbers due to SAE changes. The Turbo was still listed at 415 hp, however the X50 option was now listed at 444 hp.

The Turbo Cabriolet was introduced for the 2004 model year which was the first mass-produced Turbo Cabriolet model since the 1989 930 Turbo Cabriolet.

In 2005, Porsche introduced the Turbo S model available as either a coupé or cabriolet. The Turbo S was essentially a 996 Turbo with the X50 option but also included PCCB, 6-disc CD changer and aluminum-faced instruments.

GT variants

The 996 platform was used as the basis for two lightweight GT variants called the GT2 and the GT3. The GT3 was based on the standard 996 Carrera, but was stripped of a great deal of equipment for weight savings, featuring stiffer, adjustable suspension and upgraded brakes. The GT3 used the bodyshell of the four-wheel-drive Carrera 4, which incorporated additional front-end stiffening. The GT3 was produced in two versions. The first, commonly referred to as the Mk.I GT3, was introduced in 1999 in all markets, except North America. This engine was shared with the 996 Turbo and was a derivative of the engine developed for the 911 GT1 race car. The Mk.II was the first GT3 marketed in the North America.

The turbocharged counterpart to the GT3, the GT2, was rear-wheel drive as well, to save weight and to avoid power losses through the transmission (This is primarily due to the fact that the GT2 was built to compete in GT2 class racing, which restricted the use of an all-wheel-drive system). The GT2 received an added group of aerodynamic body parts, and a re-tuned version of the 996 Turbo's 3.6 litre, twin-turbocharged engine featuring larger turbochargers and intercoolers, a revised intake and exhaust system and re-programmed engine control software. Bigger wheels and tyres along with lightweight ceramic brakes were standard. The GT2's fixed rear wing (made of CFRP for the post-2003 cars) appears to be a concession to racing rules that usually outlaw adjustable aerodynamic components. The GT2 had no rear seat and no air conditioning and came with a factory installed roll cage. Both the GT3 and GT2 were available only with a 6-speed manual transmission.

The Turbo, GT2 and GT3 models use the Aluminum crankcase of the air-cooled 911 with its true dry sump oiling system. The six separate individual Nikasil lined cylinders in this engine are covered with two separately installed water jackets each covering a bank of 3 cylinders on each side of the engine, thus adding water cooling to a crankcase originally designed for air-cooled cylinders (the standard 996 Carrera engine has the cylinders and water jackets cast together with the crankcase).

Special editions

Porsche offered a special edition of the 996 for the year 2000. The car, named the 911 Millennium edition was based on the Carrera 4 coupé. Only 911 cars were made. It came with polished “turbo look” wheels.

This special edition was finished in Violet Chromaflair paint with natural leather interior and dark burr maple trim. The car was available with a Tiptronic or six-speed manual gearbox. A number plate on the center console and a unique "911" badge on the engine lid and lettering on the door sills make this special edition easy to identify from other base Carrera models.

Porsche celebrated the 911's 40-year history in 2003, using the slogan, "40 Jahre 911/40 Years of the 911". The company also introduced the 996 "40th Anniversary Edition" for model year 2004. This model has the 996 Turbo's front-end, and was available only in GT Silver metallic paint. Other unique features included: X51 power kit, turbo radiators, limited slip differential, sport suspension, polished 5-spoke alloy wheels (unique to this model), GT3 side skirts, natural gray leather interior (with matching luggage set), sports seats (there was a power comfort seat option), polished exhaust tips, heated seats (option in Latin America), litronic bi-xenon headlights, special dynamic sealed panels, and a special "40 Jahre 911" logo on the engine cover. Only 1,963 units were made, to commemorate 1963—the year in which the 911 was first introduced.

Statistics
Specifications for the MkI, EU spec 996 models:

Specifications for the MkII, EU spec 996 models:

Integrated dry-sump is Porsche's name for a dry sump lubrication system integrated within the engine block, i.e. no separate oil reservoir.

Production Numbers:

Individual vehicles

Movie character

Hollywood custom car builder Eddie Paul created a modified 996 Carrera as one of a set of three vehicles for Pixar's 2006 Cars promotional tour. Sally, a blue Porsche 996 designed to closely resemble a 2002 Carrera, is built on a slightly shortened wheelbase; her windshield is tilted closer to vertical (adding a few inches to the car's height) to accommodate the animated character's eyes. The vehicle is currently held in the Porsche Museum in Stuttgart, Germany.

Police car
In 2007, a motorist's 2001 Porsche 911 was searched during a traffic stop by Hoover, Alabama police. The police department seized the vehicle after they found 10 kilograms of cocaine hidden inside two compartments. Since then the vehicle was redecorated in two-tone police blue with a wing, light bar, and rear window lights. The vehicle was unveiled in 2009 as a Hoover Police Department police car and has appeared at various public events.

See also
Porsche 911

References

Further reading

External links

996 Porsche Official website
996 FAQ at Rennlist

996
Sports cars
2000s cars
Cars introduced in 1998
Cars powered by boxer engines
All-wheel-drive vehicles
Rear-wheel-drive vehicles
Rear-engined vehicles
Coupés
Convertibles